Platylesches neba, the flower-girl hopper, is a butterfly of the family Hesperiidae. It is found in Zululand, Transvaal, Zimbabwe and south-western Africa. The habitat consists of moist and dry savanna.

The wingspan is 29–34 mm for males and 31–35 mm for females. Adults are on wing year-round with peaks from September to October and from February to April. They are attracted to flowers and mud-puddle.

The larvae feed on Parinari capensis and Parinari curatellifolia. First instar larvae are yellowish leaf green with a black head, while second instars are pale leaf green with faint paler yellow-green mottling. Fourth and fifth instars are leaf green with clearer pale yellow-green mottling and a pale tan head. Young larvae live in folded-over edges of young leaves of their host plant, attaching the edges of the leaf to the midrib with fine silken threads. Third instar larvae construct a shelter by joining two young leaves with short silk threads and finally, the final instar shelter is constructed from three mature but fresh leaves held together with short, fine silk threads.

References

Butterflies described in 1877
Erionotini
Butterflies of Africa
Taxa named by William Chapman Hewitson